Corfe Castle is a village and civil parish in the English county of Dorset. It is the site of a ruined castle of the same name. The village and castle stand over a gap in the Purbeck Hills on the route between Wareham and Swanage. Both the main A351 road from Lytchett Minster to Swanage and the Swanage Railway thread their way through the gap and the village.

The civil parish of Corfe Castle stretches across the width of the Isle of Purbeck, with coasts facing both the English Channel and Poole Harbour. It, therefore, includes sections of both the low-lying sandy heathland that lies to the north of the castle and the rugged Jurassic Coast upland to the south.

History

Burial mounds around the common of Corfe Castle suggest that the area was occupied from 6000 BC. The common also points to a later Celtic field system worked by the Durotriges tribe. Evidence suggests that the tribe co-existed with the Romans in a trading relationship following the Roman invasion c. 50 AD.

The name "Corfe" is derived from the Saxon word, ceorfan, meaning to cut or carve, referring to the gap in the Purbeck hills where Corfe Castle is situated.

In the 18th century, clay quarrying developed as an industry in the village. By the middle of the century, with the arrival of William Pike – a merchant from Devon, activity expanded significantly. In 1791 Pike signed a five-year contract with Josiah Wedgwood to supply 1,200 tons of clay and search for further deposits. From the 1796 Corfe Castle Census of the 96 men involved in local industries and living in the town, 55 were clay cutters. Clay extraction continued to provide major employment for the local population until the 20th century.

Geography
To the south, it includes the smaller village of Kingston and a section of the Jurassic Coast facing the English Channel. To the north, it includes a large area of heathland stretching as far as the southern shore of Poole Harbour, where Furzey, Green, Long and Round little islands also form part of the parish. To the north west on a clear day, the Mendip Hills in Somerset can be seen in the distance from the castle. The village is constructed almost entirely from the local grey Purbeck limestone and comprises two main streets, East Street and West Street, linked at their north end at the Square.

Landmarks

The National Trust runs a shop and a tearoom in the village. The Corfe Model Village, located on the village square, is a  scale model that shows what the castle and village would have looked like in 1646 before the castle was slighted. Within the Church of St. Edward is an alabaster reredos inset with carvings in white marble, designed by the famous Victorian architect George Edmund Street R.A., which was presented by Lord Eldon in 1876. A cross in the square commemorates Queen Victoria's Diamond Jubilee of 1897. Next to the cross is a defunct village pump, bearing the village's arms. Mortons House Hotel was built in 1590 and is one of the most notable buildings in the village.

Corfe Castle

The castle stands above the village and dates back in some form to the 10th century. It was the site of the murder of Edward the Martyr in 978.
During the English Civil War it was a Royalist stronghold and was besieged twice, in 1643 and again in 1646.
It is currently owned by the National Trust and is open to the public.

Governance
The former royal status of Corfe meant that it existed as a borough electing two Members of Parliament (MPs). In the 17th and 18th centuries, with the Bankes's owning much of the property and thereby controlling most of the votes, the town was a rotten borough. The Bankes family was able to ensure that at least one of the MPs returned to the House of Commons was a member of the family or a Bankes nominee. The Reform Act 1832 abolished the rotten boroughs, and Corfe lost its direct representation. The village and castle were part of Corfe Castle hundred.

The parish now forms part of the District of Purbeck.  It is within the South Dorset constituency of the House of Commons. Prior to Brexit in 2020 it was in the South West England constituency of the European Parliament. There is an electoral ward called Castle which is based on the village, but this includes Studland and the intermediate areas. The total population of Castle ward is 1,780.

Demography
In the 2011 census Corfe Castle civil parish had 738 dwellings, 612 households and a population of 1,355.

Transport

The main route through the village is East Street which forms part of the A351 main road taking traffic to Wareham in the north and Swanage in the south. Separating the two streets is an area of common land called "the Halves".

Corfe Castle railway station lies to the east of East Street, adjacent to the village centre. Originally the only intermediate station on the London and South Western Railway's branch line from Wareham to Swanage, the station is now a stop on the Swanage Railway, a steam locomotive operated heritage railway. The railway links the tourist centres of Corfe Castle and Swanage with each other, and with a Park and Ride site at Norden station just to the north of Corfe Castle. On some days, diesel trains also run to Wareham, where they connect with National Rail services to London, Southampton, Bournemouth and Weymouth.

Notable residents
The village was for many years the residence of composer Kaikhosru Shapurji Sorabji.

Cultural references

Keith Roberts, an English science fiction writer who lived nearby, set his novel Pavane partly around the castle and similar events in an alternate history.

The children's author Enid Blyton spent time in the area, and some of her adventure stories like The Famous Five (Kirrin Island) featured castles that were said to be based on Corfe Castle.
In 1957 the Children's Film Foundation (CFF) movie "Five on a Treasure Island" was filmed in and around Corfe Castle, Corfe Castle Village and the Jurassic Coast (Durdle Door and Stairhole at Lulworth Cove).

The castle is a central setting in Ron Dawson's children's story, 'Scary Bones meets the Wacky Witches of Wareham'. One of the 'Amazing adventures of Scary Bones the Skeleton' series, the story tells how a wicked wizard has become part of the castle itself.

Corfe was featured in the 1971 film Bedknobs and Broomsticks released by The Walt Disney Company, doubling as the fictional village of Pepperinge Eye.

The Castle itself features prominently in Mike Leigh's 1976 TV play "Nuts in May". The two main characters, Keith and Candice-Marie, pay a visit to the castle during their camping holiday.

The back of Corfe Castle plus Oliver's Bistro in Corfe Castle Village are featured in the German TV thriller  based on the novel by Charlotte Link.

The juxtaposition of castle and steam train at Corfe Castle is familiar to many television viewers throughout Southern England, as it features in the opening sequences of the BBC's South Today regional news programme along with the official train.

An episode of Mary Queen of Shops centred on Mary Portas revamping the village's convenience store.

Featured in 'The Lady of Hay' by Barbara Erskine.

See also
Scoles Manor
The Shrove Tuesday Football Ceremony of the Purbeck Marblers
National Trust Properties in England

References

External links

Corfe Castle Village Website
Corfe Castle Parish Council
Corfe Castle information at the National Trust

 
Villages in Dorset
Civil parishes in Dorset
Isle of Purbeck